National Tertiary Route 415, or just Route 415 (or ) is a National Road Route of Costa Rica, located in the Cartago, Limón provinces.

Description
In Cartago province the route covers Turrialba canton (Turrialba, Peralta, Santa Teresita, La Isabel districts).

In Limón province the route covers Siquirres canton (Florida, Germania, Alegría districts).

References

Highways in Costa Rica